Leslie Smith III (born 1985 in Silver Spring, Maryland) is a contemporary African American visual artist. He currently lives and works in Madison, Wisconsin.

Life
Smith grew up in Silver Spring, Maryland, in metropolitan Washington, D.C. and graduated with a Bachelor of Fine Arts degree in Painting from the Maryland Institute College of Art (MICA) in Baltimore, Maryland in 2007. He obtained a Master of Fine Arts (MFA) degree in Painting and Printmaking from Yale University in New Haven, Connecticut in 2009. He is currently an Associate Professor of Drawing and Painting at the University of Wisconsin–Madison in Madison, Wisconsin.

Art
Leslie Smith III is an oil painter best known for his abstractions painted on shaped canvases. He engages in an expressionist-based practice, activating his canvases with bold color, gestural brushstrokes, and narratives that insinuate discord. Inspired by personal narrative and day-to-day interpersonal relationships, his paintings concentrate on employing abstraction to communicate the poetics of the human experience.

Smith has exhibited at many museums including the Madison Museum of Contemporary Art (MMoCA) in Madison, Wisconsin; the Wriston Art Galleries, Lawrence University, in Appleton, Wisconsin; the Milwaukee Art Museum in Milwaukee, Wisconsin; the Contemporary Arts Museum Houston in Houston, Texas; the Yale School of Art; the Gormley gallery of Notre Dame of Maryland University; and the Baltimore Museum of Art in Baltimore, Maryland, among others. He is the recipient of many awards, including  an American Academy in Rome summer fellowship and an Al Held Affiliate Residency Fellowship in Rome, Italy in 2009.

He is represented by Guido Maus, beta pictoris gallery / Maus Contemporary in Birmingham, AL. and by Galerie Isabelle Gounod in Paris, France.

References

External links
 Website of Leslie Smith III
 Video on painter Leslie Smith III
 I Dream Too Much: Paintings by Leslie Smith III
 Interview with Russell Panczenko-Director of the Chazen Museum of Art 
 Leslie Smith III's paintings explore trauma through abstraction at MMoCA by Jessica Steinhoff
 Leslie Smith III in “Black in the Abstract, Part 2: Soft Curves/Hard Edges” at the Contemporary Arts Museum Houston
Leslie Smith III at Hawthorn Contemporary: Paintings or Sculpture?

1985 births
Living people
People from Silver Spring, Maryland
African-American painters
Artists from Maryland
Artists from Wisconsin
American contemporary painters
Yale University alumni
Maryland Institute College of Art alumni
University of Wisconsin–Madison faculty
21st-century African-American people
20th-century African-American people